Royal Prussian Jagdstaffel 57, commonly abbreviated to Jasta 57, was a "hunting group" (i.e., fighter squadron) of the Luftstreitkräfte, the air arm of the Imperial German Army during World War I. The squadron would score over 32 aerial victories during the war. The unit's victories came at the expense of four pilots killed in action, one injured in a flying accident, four wounded in action, and one taken prisoner of war.

History
Jasta 57 was founded at the pilots and observers training school at Königsberg on 6 January 1918. The new squadron began operations on 20 January 1918. Four days later, it was incorporated into Rudolf Berthold's Jagdgruppe Nord and tasked to support 6 Armee.  On 26 February 1918, the unit flew its first combat missions. On 11 March, it scored its first aerial victories. Leutnant Hans Viebig (1897–1961), who would become Oberst of the Wehrmacht with the Knight's Cross of the Iron Cross, was first and shot down a Royal Aircraft Factory R.E.8 of the Royal Flying Corps.

On 23 April 1918, Jasta 57 was reassigned to 4 Armee. It moved once again on 6 June, to join Jagdgruppe 7 under Emil Thuy in support of 2 Armee. Five days later, JG 7 was reassigned to support 18 Armee. On 8 July 1918, Jasta 57 was posted to 1 Armee.

Commanding officer (Staffelführer)
 Paul Strähle: 6 January 1918

Duty stations
 Wasquehal, France: 24 January 1918
 Halluin: 23 April 1918
 Ennemain: 6 June 1918
 Neuflize: 8 July 1918
 Aniche, France: 21 August 1918
 Beuvry, France: 30 September 1918
 Chièvres, Belgium: 12 October 1918
 Champles: 4 November 1918

Notable personnel
 Paul Strähle
 Johannes Jensen

References

Bibliography
 

57
Military units and formations established in 1918
1918 establishments in Germany
Military units and formations disestablished in 1918